Bishamber, Bishambar or Bishambhar is an Indian masculine given name that may refer to
Bishamber Khanna, Indian painter and enamelist
Bishambhar Nath Pande (1906–1998), Indian freedom fighter, social worker and parliamentarian 
Bishamber Singh (born 1969), Indian Politician
Bishambar Singh (1940–2004), Indian wrestler

Indian masculine given names